Kalaniyot (Hebrew: "anemones") is an Israeli song that became popular in the days leading up to the establishment of the State of Israel and has remained an Israeli classic.

The lyrics, by Nathan Alterman, describe a little girl who dreams she is gathering anemones in a basket and brings them to her mother. The music, by Israeli composer Moshe Vilensky, became one of his most famous melodies.

The song was used as a code during the British Mandate to alert fighters of the Lehi and Etzel to the presence of British soldiers, alluding to their red berets.

The song was sung by Shoshana Damari. It was sung to her by family and friends when she was on her death bed.

See also
Music of Israel
Culture of Israel

References

External links
 Performance of Kalaniyot by Shoshana Damari in Youtube

Hebrew-language songs
Israeli songs
Songs about flowers
1945 songs
Code names
Lehi (militant group)
Irgun